Bharat Kumar Sitaula (Nepali: भरत कुमार सिटौला) is a famous Nepali pop singer, songwriter, composer and record producer. He started his career with his debut album "Mod-The turning point", which was a smash hit of the year 2005, and was able to grab wide audiences attention. This following with several other hit albums has established him as a well known celebrity in the Nepali Music Sector. Sitaula is one of the well paid artist in Nepal. He has recorded hundreds of songs in his voice, as well as lend his compositions to other artists. His songs and compositions have earned him  many prestigious music awards in Nepal.

Early life
Sitaula was born on January 27, 1979, in Nighuradin village of Taplejung, Nepal to Ganga Prasad Sitaula and Guna Rupa Sitaula. He attended Bijay Memorial Higher Secondary School, Dillibazar, Kathmandu. He went on to pursue a bachelor's degree in business administration from Nepal Commerce Campus, Minbhawan. He has described himself as a shy kid during his childhood.

Career

Mr. Bharat Kumar Sitaula gained musical expertise and musical knowledge being a student of music at Anurag Music School, Putalisadak, Kathmandu. He started his musical career in the year 2000 with the recording of his self-composed and penned song "Oh Bolana". He composed a number of songs for other artists in the following few years, and released his debut album "Mod-The Turning Point" in the year 2004. His first album was a huge success, and contained several hit songs such as "Achanak", "Maya Launa Tah" and "Aakash Herchu". His song "Achanak" earned him the "Best New Artist" for that year in the prestigious Hits FM Awards. His second album, “Ma Ani Timi” was released in the year 2006, and was also an instant hit soon after its release. The release of his second album made him reach new heights of success with several songs from the album such as “Kahile Aago Kahile Pani”, “Oh Riya”, “Huncha Bhane Huncha” being very popular at the time. Over the course of time, he has given multiple other hits such as "Hare Ram Hare Ram", "Pardeshma", "Baisama" and "Chiso Chiso" to name a few. He has also composed songs for various Nepali movies such as "Ma Ani Timi", "Kaamchor", and "Timro Manko Maanche Ma".

He has travelled throughout Nepal as well as outside Nepal for his musical programs. He is currently working on his new album "Baisama".

TV career 
He joined the popular media channel "Himalaya Television" in the year 2010, where he proved himself as a skilled media personnel. At the Himalaya TV, Sitaula worked as a Senior Program Producer up until 2016. He produced many popular programs like "Dhamala ko Hamala","Music Station","Music Cafe","Jukebox","Paluwa" etc.

Discography

Albums
Mod-The Turning Point      2060 B.S
Ma ani timi                         2063 B.S
Mahima                              2066 B.S
Baisama

Awards and nominations 
Hits F.M Music Award : Best New Artist of the year 2005 A.D (WINNER)
Kalika F.M Music Award : Best Pop Vocal Male 2073 B.S(WINNER) 
Kalika F.M Music Award : Best Pop Music Composition 2066 B.S (WINNER)
Hits FM Music Award  : Best Pop Vocal Male 2017 (Nominated)  
Hits FM Music Award  :  Best Pop Vocal Male 2018 (Nominated)   
Image FM Music Award : Best Pop Vocal Male 2017 (Nomination)
Arina Music Award : Best Pop Vocal Male 2017 (Nomination)

International Tours

 Europe           2009
 Hong Kong     2014
 Europe            2016
 Japan              2016
 Qatar               2017
 Australia          2017

References

Nepalese singer-songwriters
Nepalese pop singers
Nepali-language singers
People from Taplejung District